Statistics of Mestaruussarja in the 1979 season.

Overview
Preliminary Stage was contested by 12 teams, and higher 8 teams go into Championship Group. Lower 4 teams fought in promotion/relegation group with higher 4 teams of Ykkönen.

OPS Oulu won the championship.

Preliminary stage

Table

Results

Championship group

Table

Results

Promotion/relegation group

Table

The teams obtained bonus points on the basis of their preliminary stage position.

Results

References
Finland - List of final tables (RSSSF)

Mestaruussarja seasons
Fin
Fin
1